F4 (Flower Four) or JVKV was a Taiwanese boy band consisting of Jerry Yan, Vanness Wu, Ken Chu, and Vic Chou. The group F4 was formed in 2001 after the Taiwanese drama Meteor Garden that they starred in was widely successful. Together they have starred in several Taiwanese drama series and released three albums, Meteor Rain (2001), Fantasy 4ever (2002), and Waiting for You (2007).

According to Forbes, F4 has sold 3.5 million copies of their first two albums all over Asia as of July 2003. In 2007, due to copyright issues, the group changed its name to JVKV, using the descending age of the initials of its members. Other than their country of origin, Taiwan, they have also attained popularity in other parts of Asia, such as the Philippines, mainland China, Hong Kong, Singapore, Malaysia, Thailand, Indonesia, Japan, and South Korea.

History

2001: Formation and Meteor Garden
The group formed as a result of the success of a Taiwanese drama series, Meteor Garden. The series is an adaptation of the Japanese shōjo manga series Hana Yori Dango. Yan plays the lead role of Dao Ming Si, an extremely arrogant and rich university student who meets his match in the poor but proud girl, Shan Cai. Chou, Wu and Chu play as his friends Hua Ze Lei, Mei Zuo, and Xi Men, respectively. In the series, the four guys identify themselves as a group called "Flower Four", or often shortened as F4.

Meteor Garden was released in Taiwan in 2001 and turned the leads into stars virtually overnight. In 2002 Meteor Garden was released in Hong Kong, Singapore, Malaysia, Thailand, Indonesia, Japan, Korea and the Philippines in 2003. The series was aired on Xing Kong channel, and was later remade in China. A sequel, Meteor Garden II, was shot in Spain later and released in 2002.

2001–04: Musical venture, Meteor Rain, and Fantasy 4ever
In 2001, F4 became a boy band and signed a record deal with Sony Music Taiwan. In the same year they released their debut album, Meteor Rain, and in the following year they released Fantasy 4ever. The album includes the Mandarin version of "Can't Help Falling in Love" that they recorded for the Asian version of Walt Disney's Lilo & Stitch soundtrack, a Mandarin version of "Yo Te Amo" by Chayanne, and a Pepsi advertisement theme song "Ask For More".

In 2003, they embarked on an Asian tour to support Fantasy 4ever, and went on an unannounced hiatus in 2004 afterwards as the members began to focus on their solo careers.

2007–08: Waiting for You and name change to JVKV
On April 29, 2007, Meteor Garden producer Angie Chai announced that the group would no longer be known as F4. The change in name stemmed from copyright-related issues. Japanese publisher Shueisha, who owns the copyright to Hana Yori Dango allowed the group to use F4 as its band name in 2001. However, as Japan had filmed and aired its own live action versions of the popular manga, with its own cast of four, the publisher felt that there may be confusion over the name in different countries. Due to this conflict, the group was renamed JVKV using the first initials of each of the group's members. According to the producer, the members are listed in the new name by the order of their birth dates from oldest to youngest, thus Vanness Wu's name appears before Vic Chou's.

Despite rumours of disbanding, JVKV released their third album, Waiting For You, on December 28, 2007. Their third album still bore the name F4, not JVKV. F4 were the first foreign artists to hold 7 consecutive concerts in Japan.

2013: Jiangsu TV's Spring Festival
In January 2013, the group was confirmed to perform at Jiangsu TV's Spring Festival in China along with Harlem Yu.<ref>{{cite web|last=Belmonte |first=Maureen Marie |title='Meteor Gardens F4 To Reunite at China's Spring Festival |url=http://www.mb.com.ph/articles/389158/meteor-garden-s-f4-to-reunite-at-china-s-spring-festival#.UP05PWej4a8 |publisher=The Manila Bulletin |access-date=January 21, 2013 |date=January 11, 2013 |url-status=dead |archive-url=https://web.archive.org/web/20130120152016/http://mb.com.ph/articles/389158/meteor-garden-s-f4-to-reunite-at-china-s-spring-festival |archive-date=January 20, 2013 |df=mdy }}</ref> The performance was taped in Beijing on January 30, 2013, and was aired on February 10, 2013. It was their first performance together in four years. During the show, they hinted that they were going to have a concert tour in China, which did not come to fruition.

Members

Solo projects
JVKV are also individually concentrating on their solo careers in both acting and music. Three of them appeared in Wish To See You Again, starring Chou and Chu, while Wu made a few guest appearances in a few episodes. Due to scheduling conflicts, Yan did not star in the series; his part was played by Kingone Wang. Yan filmed a series in Taiwan alongside Wu Chun of Fahrenheit and Show Lo, called Hot Shot otherwise known as 篮球火 which was released in the Summer 2008.

Jerry Yan

In August 2004, Yan came out with his first solo album titled, The First Time (第一次 Jerry for You). He's acted in Taiwanese drama series such as Spicy Teacher, Meteor Garden, its sequel Meteor Garden 2, Meteor Rain, Come to My Place, Love Scar, The Hospital, and made a movie, Magic Kitchen 魔幻廚房 (2004). Hot Shot (2008) was broadcast in Taiwan, and Starlit aired in Taiwan in 2009; and Down With Love.

Vanness Wu

Wu focused his attention on both movies and music. He first released a solo album titled  Body Will Sing in 2002, and has since released several more albums. He also has been featured in several music videos, such as "Ai Cuo" with Wang Leehom, the Chinese version of "Crazy in Love" with Beyoncé, and Coco Lee's "Hip Hop Tonight". Besides music, he also has been acting as well, notably in Autumn's Concerto (下一站，幸福) with Ady An. He also has been involved with several big-screen movies such as Star Runner, Kung Fu Fighter, Three Kingdoms: Resurrection of the Dragon, and Dragon Squad, among others. He also took part in China's Jiangsu TV's "Stars in Danger: The High Dive" (星跳水立方). As of 2013, he has released two Japanese albums, Reflections and Reason. He has also collaborated with Kangta from H.O.T on the album Scandal, which was produced by SM Entertainment.

Vic Chou

Chou was the first JVKV member to release a solo album. He has since came out with 3 solo albums, Make a Wish (2002), Remember I Love You (2004), and I'm not F4 (2007).

He was also on the big hits "love storm" with other fellow JVKV member, Ken Zu.

Ken Chu

Chu released his own cookbook, Delicious Relations (美味關係) in 2006, after starring in a string of idol dramas. He has also starred in at least one drama per year since 2001, except 2005, where he came out with his own solo album, On Ken's Time''. He has released his 2nd solo album "Getting Real" in January 2009.

Discography

Filmography

Awards

References

External links

 Can't Help Falling In Love  - Sony Music Taiwan
F4Vevo
  Official SonyMusic F4 360 site
 F4 in CNN's Talkasia

Boys Over Flowers
Mandopop musical groups
Taiwanese boy bands
Vocal quartets
Taiwanese idols
Taiwanese Hokkien pop singers